The 2008 CERH Women's European Cup was the 2nd edition of the CERH European League organized by CERH. Its final eight was held in May 2008 at Mealhada, Portugal.

Voltregà achieved their first title.

Preliminary round
Gijón, Herringen and Voltregà received a bye for the final stage.

|}

Final eight
The final eight was played by eight teams in Mealhada, Portugal. Teams were divided into two groups, where the two first qualified teams would join the semifinals.

Group stage
In each group, teams played against each other home-and-away in a home-and-away round-robin format.

The group winners advanced to the final four.

Group A

Group B

5th to 8th position

Final four

References

External links
 CERH website

CERH
Rink Hockey European Female League